Thirakkatha ( is a 2008 Malayalam romantic drama film co-produced, written, and directed by Ranjith. The film is a tribute to the yesteryear actresses who had been graceful, popular figures in cinema during their younger age with patronage and later got completely disregarded by the industry, media and the masses alike. 

Ranjith emphasized that the film should be seen as a work of fiction and not as the real-life story of Srividya or any other actress. The story shifts between the present and flashbacks through the perspective of different characters. The story is divided into three monologues which meet in the climax. The film has garnered positive reviews from critics and audiences alike.

The film won the National Film Award for Best Feature Film in Malayalam (Ranjith and Maha Subair). And Priyamani won the Filmfare Awards South for Best Actress.

Plot

Akbar Ahmed is a film director. Friends call him 'Akky'. After his highly successful first film, he becomes the most wanted director in the Malayalam film industry.  Akky and his girl friend Devayani along with a group of friends all share a passion for cinema. It was with them that Akbar directed and produced his first film, which went on to become a huge success. Akbar also runs a cafe called Casablanca named after the classic Hollywood film. For Akbar cinema is not a job, it is his passion. Akbar decides to choose a very different kind of story for his second film and he sets on a journey in search of it.

Akbar decides to base his second film on the life of yesteryear actress Malavika, who was once a very popular actress and whose present whereabouts are unknown. Akbar and his friends go tracking Malavika’s biography. Her husband was Ajaya Chandran. Currently Ajayachandran is the reigning super star of the industry. Akbar starts his search from film director Aby Kuruvila’s house. Kuruvila’s son gives his father’s old letters and diaries to Akbar from which he starts learning about the whirlwind romance of Malavika and Ajayachandran which led to marriage. How differences between them led to a breakup and how this affected their careers along with Akbar's efforts to find Malavika form the major plot of the film. The film ends in a touching yet marvelous climax with a poetic narration.

Cast

Reception

The film was received well with audiences and critics alike.  Some of the major reviews in the media were all praises for the film. Nowrunning.com opined that "It is a charming film that's plainly life-affirming without being overly pretentious or markedly melodramatic". Paresh C Palicha at Rediff.com opined that "It is exciting to see Ranjith bounce back to form with his best effort so far." Almost all reviewers were unanimous about the brilliant performances of the lead stars, especially of Priyamani, Anoop Menon and Prithviraj.

Accolades
2008 : Film Awards
National Film Awards 
National Film Award for Best Feature Film in Malayalam

Kerala State Film Awards
Kerala State Film Award for Second Best Actor -Anoop Menon
Best Makeup - Ranjith Ambadi

Filmfare Awards South
Filmfare Award for Best Actress - Malayalam - Priyamani
Best Film Malayalam
Best Director  - Ranjith
Best Music Director - Sharath
Best Female Playback Singer -K.S.Chithra

Music
The score and soundtrack of the movie were composed by Sharreth, who returned to the field after a long gap.

References

https://www.academia.edu/9204740/When_Ghosts_Come_Calling_Re-projecting_the_Disappeared_Muses_of_Malayalam_Cinema

External links
 

2000s Malayalam-language films
2008 romantic drama films
2008 films
Indian films about cancer
Films shot in Kozhikode
Films directed by Ranjith
Films scored by Sharreth
Best Malayalam Feature Film National Film Award winners
Indian romantic drama films